, is a Japanese professional footballer who plays as a forward for Tiamo Hirakata.

Career
Matsumoto joined Nagoya Grampus and then he was loaned to SC Sagamihara in Summer 2018. On 10 January 2019, Matsumoto joined FC Maruyasu Okazaki.

Club statistics
Updated to 3 September 2018.

References

External links

Profile at J. League
Profile at Nagoya Grampus

1994 births
Living people
Japanese footballers
Association football people from Kanagawa Prefecture
Association football forwards
J1 League players
J2 League players
J3 League players
Nagoya Grampus players
SC Sagamihara players
FC Maruyasu Okazaki players